Lilian Sumner Gilbert is a New Zealand fashion model based in New York City.

Early life 
Sumner grew up between Wellington, Auckland and Napier, New Zealand with six sisters and one brother Her mother is writer Barbara Sumner-Burstyn. Her father is New Zealand film editor and Academy Award winner John Gilbert.

Career 
Sumner started her career in London at age 17. She made her official runway debut with Hedi Slimane at Yves Saint Laurent. She has walked the runway for Sonia Rykiel, Miu Miu, Kenzo, Haider Ackermann, Lanvin, Vionnet, Marc Jacobs, Kate Spade, Diane von Fürstenberg, and Céline.

Sumner has been on the cover of Numéro, Vogue Ukraine, Vogue Czechoslovakia, Vogue Italia, Modern Matter, Double, Purple, Zoo, Document, 10 Magazine, Arena Homme + and more. .

Sumner wrote and directed a short film in 2019 titled Lucan Asks Why starring Coco Gordon-Moore and Lilac Cianciolo.
The film was part-funded by Gucci and debuted at the Gucci Wooster Store in New York City.

References 

Living people
1994 births
New Zealand female models
New Zealand expatriates in the United States
People from Auckland
Next Management models